Wandsbek is the second-largest of seven boroughs that make up the city and state of Hamburg, Germany. The name of the district is derived from the river Wandse which passes through here. Wandsbek, which was formerly an independent city, is urban and, along with Eilbek and Marienthal, part of the city's economic and cultural core. In 2020 the population was 442,702.

History
Wandsbek was the place of residence of the poet Johann Heinrich Voss and of Matthias Claudius, who here issued (1771–1775) the newspaper  (The Wandsbeck Messenger). There is a monument to Claudius in the town.

During World War II from May 2, 1944 until May 3, 1945 a subcamp of the Nazi concentration camp of Neuengamme was located in Wandsbek, listed as no. 565 Hamburg-Wandsbek in the official German list.

On January 1, 2007 the Ortsämter (Precincts) were dissolved and the organisation of all boroughs of Hamburg was restructured. In the borough Wandsbek to the former precinct Wandsbek had belonged the quarters Eilbek, Jenfeld, Marienthal, Tonndorf, Wandsbek and Rahlstedt. The quarters Hummelsbüttel, Poppenbüttel, Sasel and Wellingsbüttel belonged to the precinct Alstertal. The precinct Bramfeld consisted of Bramfeld and Steilshoop. The precinct Rahlstedt were the quarter Rahlstedt. And the precinct Walddörfer were Bergstedt, Duvenstedt, Farmsen-Berne, Lemsahl-Mellingstedt, Volksdorf and Wohldorf-Ohlstedt.

Geography
In the north and the east it borders the state of Schleswig-Holstein, in the south the Hamburg-Mitte borough and in the west Hamburg-Nord borough mostly. Only three quarters, Eilbek, Wandsbek, and Marienthal, in the core of the borough are urban. The more northerly parts of Wohldorf-Ohlstedt, Volksdorf, Duvenstedt are still quite rural, where one can find a mix of newer residences and farms.

Administrative divisions

Like the other boroughs of Hamburg, Wandsbek is divided into quarters. They are:

Demographics 
The population of Wandsbek in 2006 was 409,771 people. In 1999 there were 200,560 households, out of which 21.2% had children under the age of 18 living with them and 41.6% of all households were made up of individuals. The average household size was 2.02.

In 2006 there were 37,957 criminal offences in the borough (93 crimes per 1,000 people).

Government
Wandsbek is a subdivision of Hamburg.

Borough Assembly

|-
! colspan="2" style="text-align:left;" | Parties
! %
! ±
! Seats
|-
| style="background-color:" |
| style="text-align:left;" | Social Democratic Party
| 26.7
|  11.2
| style="text-align:center;" | 16
|-
| style="background-color:" |
| style="text-align:left;" | Alliance 90/The Greens
| 26.3
|  13.1
| style="text-align:center;" | 15
|-
| style="background-color:" |
| style="text-align:left;" | Christian Democratic Union
| 22.2
|  7.1
| style="text-align:center;" | 13
|-
| style="background-color:" |
| style="text-align:left;" | Alternative for Germany
| 7.7
|  2.2
| style="text-align:center;" | 5
|-
| style="background-color:" |
| style="text-align:left;" | The Left
| 7.2
|  0.0
| style="text-align:center;" | 4
|-
| style="background-color:" |
| style="text-align:left;" | Free Democratic Party
| 7.0
|  3.1
| style="text-align:center;" | 4
|-
| style="background-color:" |
| style="text-align:left;" | Pirate Party
| 1.2
|  0.7
| style="text-align:center;" | 0
|-
| style="background-color:#d4d4d3" |
| style="text-align:left;" | Others
| 1.7
|  0.7
| style="text-align:center;" | 0
|-
! colspan="2" style="text-align:left;" | Total
! style="text-align:center;" colspan="2"| 
! style="text-align:center;" | 57
|}

Infrastructure
There are 61 elementary and 46 secondary schools in the borough of Wandsbek, 695 physicians in private practice and 91 pharmacies.

According to the Department of Motor Vehicles (Kraftfahrt-Bundesamt), there are 171,334 private cars registered (421 cars/1000 people).

Points of interest
 Botanischer Sondergarten Wandsbek, a municipal botanical garden
 Wandsbek Studios of Studio Hamburg GmbH

See also
 Hamburg-Wandsbek (electoral district) the German federal parliamentary district covering the borough
 Seebek
 Jonathan Eybeschutz

Notes

References

 Statistical office Hamburg and Schleswig-Holstein Statistisches Amt für Hamburg und Schleswig-Holstein, official website

External links

 
Boroughs of Hamburg
Neuengamme concentration camp